St Raphael's Estate is a housing estate in Neasden and part of the London Borough of Brent in Northwest London, England. A community centre is located within the estate on Rainborough Close. It forms part of the NW10 postcode.

The low-density estate was built between 1967 and 1982, although some of the land dates back further as Brentfield Estate. It has about 1,174 properties of which the vast majority are owned by the local Brent authority. The estate has a relatively high rate of child poverty, and its geographic location makes it somewhat isolated from Wembley or other retail town centres. To its east, St Raphael's Estate is cut by the A406 North Circular Road dual carriageway, while to its west the River Brent and a recreational ground separates it from the Tokyngton locality of Wembley. The superstores of Brent Park are directly to its north.

It is proposed as of 2010 that 21 new homes will be built on the estate.

The majority of the inhabitants are of Afro-Caribbean heritage.

Transport
Two London bus routes terminate at Pifield Way: the 224 and the 232. The 92 terminates at Drury Way ("St Raphael's North"). Because St Raphael's is very close to Brent Park, there are links to many other bus routes, at IKEA and Tesco, and along the North Circular Road.

Stonebridge Park station and Neasden tube station are the nearest train stations.

Notable residents
 Raheem Sterling - footballer.
 George the Poet - musician
 Emmanuel Abebe - footballer
 Chunkz - entertainer
 Tazer Black - entertainer

Notable sites and organisations
 Sufra - a local charity that is run in the location.
 St. Raphael's Edible Garden - A public growing garden for local residents which is a part of Sufra.

See also
South Kilburn
Stonebridge
Chalkhill Estate
St. Raphael's Edible Garden

References

Buildings and structures in the London Borough of Brent
Housing estates in London